Denys Yuriyovych Popov (born 17 February 1999) is a Ukrainian professional footballer who plays as a defender for FC Dynamo Kyiv.

Club career
Born in Pervomaisk Raion, Popov is a product of the RVUFK Kyiv and Dynamo Kyiv youth sportive schools.

He played for FC Dynamo in the Ukrainian Premier League Reserves and in July 2017 he was promoted to the senior squad team. Popov made his debut in the Ukrainian Premier League for Dynamo Kyiv only on 13 April 2019, playing in a winning match against FC Mariupol.

International career
In 2019, Popov played a key role in Ukraine U20's first ever FIFA U-20 World Cup title. He appeared in six of his team's seven matches at the tournament, scoring three goals. He missed the final against South Korea after being sent off in the semifinal match against Italy.

He made his debut for Ukraine national team on 23 May 2021 in a friendly against Bahrain.

Career statistics

International

Honours
Dynamo Kyiv
Ukrainian Premier League: 2020–21
Ukrainian Cup: 2019–20, 2020–21
Ukrainian Super Cup: 2018, 2019, 2020

Ukraine U20
FIFA U-20 World Cup: 2019

References

External links 
 
 

1999 births
Living people
Piddubny Olympic College alumni
Sportspeople from Mykolaiv Oblast
Ukrainian footballers
FC Dynamo Kyiv players
Ukrainian Premier League players
Association football defenders
Ukraine youth international footballers
Ukraine under-21 international footballers
Ukraine international footballers
UEFA Euro 2020 players